Trigonoptera ornata is a species of beetle in the family Cerambycidae. It was described by William John Macleay in 1886, originally under the genus Aegomomus.

References

Tmesisternini
Beetles described in 1886